The Clark Stakes is an American Thoroughbred horse race held annually in late November at Churchill Downs in Louisville, Kentucky. Among the oldest races in the United States, it was first run in 1875, the year the racetrack opened for business. Currently a Grade I event, it is open to horses age three and older and is contested on dirt over a distance of  miles (9 furlongs). It was known as the Clark Handicap through 2018 before the race conditions were changed to set weights and allowances in 2019.

The race is named in honor of Colonel M. Lewis Clark, founder of the Louisville Jockey Club which built Churchill Downs.

Through 1901, it was restricted to three-year-old horses.

Since inception, the Clark Handicap has been run at various distances:
 2 miles : 1875–1880
  miles : 1881–1895
  miles : 1896–1901, 1922–1924, 1955–present
  miles : 1902–1921, 1925–1954

The race was run in two divisions in 1953.

Records
Speed record: (at current distance of  miles)
 1:47.39 – Premium Tap (2006)

Most wins
 2 – Hodge (1915, 1916)
 2 – Bold Favorite (1968, 1969)
 2 – Bob's Dusty (1977, 1978)

Most wins by a jockey
 4 – Isaac Burns Murphy (1879, 1884,1885, 1890)
 4 – Pat Day (1984, 1985, 1990, 2000)

Most wins by a trainer
 3 – Ben A. Jones (1942, 1946, 1951)
 3 – Smiley Adams (1977, 1978, 1979)
 3 – Bob Baffert (1996, 1998, 2014)
Most Wins by an owner

 3 – Robert N. Lehmann (1977, 1978, 1979)

Winners

† In 2003, Evening Attire won the race but was disqualified for interference in the stretch and set back to second.‡ In 2010, Successful Dan won the race but was disqualified and placed third for interference.

References
 Thoroughbred Times article on Premium Tap's record-setting win in the 2005 Clark Handicap
 The 2008 Clark Handicap at the NTRA

Graded stakes races in the United States
1875 establishments in Kentucky
Open mile category horse races
Recurring sporting events established in 1875
Churchill Downs horse races